Love Live! is a Japanese multimedia project created by Hajime Yatate and Sakurako Kimino. Each of the individual titles within the franchise revolve around teenage girls who become "school idols". A 13-episode anime television series of Love Live! School Idol Project produced by Sunrise, directed by Takahiko Kyōgoku, and written by Jukki Hanada aired in Japan on Tokyo MX from January 6 to March 31, 2013 and was simulcast by Crunchyroll. An original video animation episode was released on November 27, 2013. A second season aired on Tokyo MX from April 6 to June 29, 2014, also airing on TV Aichi, Yomiuri TV, and BS11, and was simulcast by Crunchyroll.

Both seasons are licensed in North America by NIS America, who released the premium edition of the first season on Blu-ray on September 2, 2014 and an English dubbed version was released with the standard edition of the first season, along with the premium edition of the second season, on February 14, 2016, as well as the standard edition of the second season on April 12, 2016. MVM Entertainment released the first season in the United Kingdom on July 27, 2015 on DVD, with plans to release it on Blu-ray Disc in 2016 with an English dub. MVM Entertainment also released the second season in 2016. Madman Entertainment released the first season in Australia and New Zealand on June 10, 2015 on DVD.

A 13-episode anime television series of Love Live! Sunshine!! produced by Sunrise, directed by Kazuo Sakai, and written by Hanada aired between July 2 and September 24, 2016 and was simulcast by Crunchyroll. A 13-episode second season aired between October 7 and December 30, 2017. The series is licensed in North America by Funimation, in the United Kingdom by Anime Limited, and in Australia by Madman Entertainment. An English dub by Funimation began streaming from July 30, 2016.

A 13-episode anime television series of Love Live! Nijigasaki High School Idol Club produced by Bandai Namco Filmworks, directed by Tomoyuki Kawamura, and written by Jin Tanaka, aired between October 3 and December 26, 2020. It was also streamed live through the Bandai Channel, Line Live, and YouTube Live. A second season aired between April 2 and June 25, 2022.

A 12-episode anime television series of Love Live! Superstar!! produced by Bandai Namco Filmworks, directed by Kyogoku, and written by Hanada, aired on NHK Educational TV between July 11 and October 17, 2021. Funimation has licensed the series for international releases. A second season aired between July 17 and October 9, 2022. A third season has been announced.

Series overview

Episode list

Love Live! School Idol Project (2013–2014)

Love Live! Sunshine!! (2016–2017)

Love Live! Nijigasaki High School Idol Club (2020–2022)

Love Live! Superstar!! (2021)

Notes

References

Lists of anime episodes
Love Live!